Zbu (Chinese Ribu 日部), or Showu, is a Rgyalrong language spoken in Sichuan, China.

The Khalong Tibetan language has a Showu (Zbu) substratum, as evident from its phonology and grammar.

Distribution
Gates (2012: 105–106) lists the following locations where Zbu is spoken. It is spoken by over 6,000 people in 28 villages.
Sìdàbà (Written Tibetan: Stod-pa) District of Barkam County: in Kāngshān (Khang-sar) and Rìbù (rDzong-’bur) Townships
Rangtang County: Wúyī Township and Shili Township, in Shàngdàshígōu, Zhōngdàshígōu, and Xiàdàshígōu Villages. Shili Township also has Shangzhai (sTodsde/Northern Horpa) speakers.
Gēlètuó Township, Seda County, Ganzi Prefecture: in Tshopo, Nyagluo, Rabde, and Tshekho Villages
southwestern corner of Ābà/rNga-ba County: in Kēhé and Róngān Townships (Asejie, Mengu, Sharga, Ganba, and Tsega Villages). Amdo Tibetan is the local lingua franca.

References

Sources
 
 

Qiangic languages
Languages of China